Konthagai is a village in the Papanasam taluk of Thanjavur district, Tamil Nadu, India.

Demographics 

As per the 2001 census, Konthagai had a total population of 507 with 245 males and 262 females. The sex ratio was 1069. The literacy rate was 64.8.

References 

 

Villages in Thanjavur district